Leo Casey (born 17 September 1965) is a former Ireland international rugby league footballer who played in the 1980s, 1990s and 2000s, and coached in the 2000s.

Background

Playing career

International honours
Leo Casey won 5 caps for Ireland in 1995–1997 while at Featherstone Rovers, and Swinton.

County Cup Final appearances
Leo Casey played left-, i.e. number 8, (replaced by interchange/substitute xJohn Fairbank ) in Oldham's 16-24 defeat by Warrington in the 1989 Lancashire County Cup Final during the 1989–90 season at Knowsley Road, St. Helens on Saturday 14 October 1989.

Division Two Premiership Final appearances
Leo Casey played left-, i.e. number 8, in Featherstone Rovers' 20-16 victory over Workington Town in the Division Two Premiership Final during the 1992–93 season at Old Trafford, Manchester on Wednesday 19 May 1993.

References

External links
Statistics at orl-heritagetrust.org.uk

1965 births
Living people
English rugby league players
Featherstone Rovers players
Ireland national rugby league team players
Oldham R.L.F.C. players
Place of birth missing (living people)
Rugby league props
Swinton Lions players